A Great Wall is a 1986 comedy-drama film written, directed and starring Peter Wang. It was the first American feature film shot in the People's Republic of China and was Kelvin Han Yee's first film.

Plot
When a Silicon Valley Chinese American executive goes back to his homeland of China for the first time in 30 years, he and his family encounter many culture clashes between the lives that they lead in the United States and the lives of their relatives in China. The finale of the movie includes an exciting table tennis match involving the Chinese-American son played by Kelvin Han Yee.

Cast 

 Peter Wang as Leo Fang
 Kelvin Han Yee as Paul Fang
 Li Qinqin as Chao Lili
 Shen Guanglan as Mrs. Chao
 Hu Xiaoguang as Mr. Chao
 Wang Xiao as Liu Yida
 Sharon Iwai as Grace Fang
 Xiu Jian as Yu

Reception
The film was met with critical acclaim. The film has a score of 80% with a certified "Fresh" rating on Rotten Tomatoes based on 5 reviews.

Acclaimed film critic Roger Ebert from the Chicago-Sun Times awarded the film with 3 out of 4 stars and wrote of the film saying "A Great Wall is a human comedy about a Chinese-American family that goes to visit relatives in Peking, and within that simple premise are so many inspirations that the movie is interesting even when it's just looking at things." and went on to say "The chief pleasure of "A Great Wall" is its observation of the different attitudes toward the daily process of living in China and the United States."

References

External links
 
 
 

1986 films
1986 comedy-drama films
American comedy-drama films
American independent films
Films about Chinese Americans
1980s Mandarin-language films
Films about race and ethnicity
Films shot in China
1986 comedy films
1986 drama films
Chinese-language American films
1980s English-language films
1986 independent films
1986 multilingual films
American multilingual films
1980s American films